Saint-Zacharie is a municipality in the Municipalité régionale de comté des Etchemins in Quebec, Canada. It is part of the Chaudière-Appalaches region and the population is 1,684 as of 2021. The new constitution dates from 1990, when the township municipality and the village municipality of Saint-Zacharie amalgamated, but the area was settled as early as 1873. Saint-Zacharie is named after oblate Zacharie Lacasse, a missionary who brought settlers to the area in 1881.

Saint-Zacharie is located on the Canada–United States border and has a small border crossing for traffic coming from the United States, St. Zacharie Crossing.

References

Commission de toponymie du Québec
Ministère des Affaires municipales, des Régions et de l'Occupation du territoire
Canada Border Services Agency
U.S. Customs and Border Protection

Incorporated places in Chaudière-Appalaches
Designated places in Quebec
Municipalities in Quebec